An Chun-Young (born 1 July 1944) is a Korean former wrestler who competed in the 1968 Summer Olympics and in the 1972 Summer Olympics.

References

External links
 

1944 births
Living people
Olympic wrestlers of South Korea
Wrestlers at the 1968 Summer Olympics
Wrestlers at the 1972 Summer Olympics
South Korean male sport wrestlers
20th-century South Korean people